Gjallarhorn  refers to both a musical instrument and a drinking horn in Norse mythology.

Gjallarhorn may also refer to:
 Gjallarhorn (band), a Swedish language folk music band from Finland
 Gjallarhorn (album), 2005 album by Japanese band 9mm Parabellum Bullet
 Gjallarhorn, magazine published by the National Socialist Movement of Norway
 Gjallarhorn, fictional organization in the anime series Mobile Suit Gundam: Iron-Blooded Orphans
"Gjallarhorn" an exotic rocket launcher from the game Destiny (video game)
 Gjallarhorn (album), a 2017 album but Danheim for the single album 
 Gjallarhorn (song), a song by Danheim from his album Munarvágr